Ekow Eshun (born 27 May 1968) is a British writer, journalist, broadcaster, and curator.  He is a former editor of  Arena magazine, and the former director of the Institute of Contemporary Arts. He is Chair of the Fourth Plinth Commissioning Group and Creative Director of Calvert 22 Foundation.

Biography
Ekow Eshun was born in London, the younger brother of writer Kodwo Eshun. His family are Fante from Ghana. His father, whom he calls "Joe", was a supporter of Kwame Nkrumah and was working at the Ghanaian High Commission when Nkrumah was overthrown in a military–police coup in February 1966. He continued to support Nkrumah, visited him in Conakry, Guinea, where he was in exile and in September 1967 took the risk of returning to West Africa, where he was arrested in Benin and returned to Ghana, where he spent two years in prison. Although three years (1971–74) of Eshun's childhood were spent in Accra, for the most part, he was brought up in London, He attended Kingsbury High School in North West London, later reading history and politics at the London School of Economics. During his time there, he edited both Features and Arts for the student newspaper The Beaver.

He was the director of the Institute of Contemporary Arts in London from 2005 to 2010 during a period of turmoil for the organisation, leaving before the end of his six-month notice period.

He has occasionally appeared as a critic on Saturday Review on BBC Radio 4 and formerly on BBC Two's The Review Show. He appeared in 2009 in the television advertisements for Aviva (formerly Norwich Union). He has also often appeared on More4's topical talk show The Last Word. In 2019, he was the captain of the London School of Economics team on Christmas University Challenge. In October 2021 he wrote and presented White Mischief, a three part documentary on BBC Radio 4 on the history of whiteness.

Eshun's memoir, Black Gold of the Sun: Searching for Home in England and Africa, published in 2005, deals with a return trip to Ghana, Ghanaian history, and matters of identity and race. Reviewing the book for the New Statesman, Margaret Busby said: "His rich memoir, which comes fittingly adorned with a golden jacket designed by Chris Ofili, attempts to answer the question: 'Where are you from?' Eshun’s search for home and identity is sometimes achingly poignant, a story of semi-detachment, of fragmentation and duality, which must have been cathartic to write. 'There is no singularity to truth' is its refrain." Black Gold of the Sun was nominated for an Orwell Prize in 2006.

Works 
In the Black Fantastic (2022)

References

External links
 Ekow Eshun website: unavailable 26 Nov. 2021
Full transcript of a talk given by Ekow Eshun about his book Black Gold of the Sun

1968 births
Alumni of the London School of Economics
Black British television personalities
Black British writers
English people of Ghanaian descent
Living people
Writers from London
British male journalists
21st-century English male writers